Maestrazgo may refer to:
Maestrat, an historic and natural region in the Spanish province of Castellón
Alt Maestrat, a comarca in the Spanish province of Castellón
Baix Maestrat, a comarca in the Spanish province of Castellón
Maestrazgo, Aragon, a comarca in the Spanish province of Teruel, Aragon